The 1957 Iowa State Cyclones football team represented Iowa State College of Agricultural and Mechanic Arts (later renamed Iowa State University) in the Big Seven Conference during the 1957 NCAA University Division football season. In their first and only year under head coach Jim Myers, the Cyclones compiled a 4–5–1 record (2–4 against conference opponents), tied for fifth place in the conference, and were outscored by their opponents by a combined total of 160 to 142. They played their home games at Clyde Williams Field in Ames, Iowa.

The team's regular starting lineup on offense consisted of left end Brian Dennis, left tackle Andris Poncius, left guard Bob Bird, center Jack Falter, right guard Dave Munger, right tackle Don Metcalf, right end Jim Stuelke, quarterback Marv Walter, left halfback Dwight Nichols, right halfback Jim Lary, and fullback Bob Harden. John Falter and Marv Walter were the team captains.

The team's statistical leaders included Dwight Nichols with 668 rushing yards and 751 passing yards, Brian Dennis with 252 receiving yards, and Dwight Nichols and Terry Ingram with 24 points each. Dwight Nichols was selected as a first-team all-conference player.

Schedule

References

Iowa State
Iowa State Cyclones football seasons
Iowa State Cyclones football